Lorenzo Girolamo Mattei (29 May 1748, Rome - 24 July 1833) was an Italian cardinal from the house of Mattei. He was promoted to cardinal by pope Gregory XVI in the consistory of 15 April 1833. He was also nominal Latin Patriarch of Antioch.

References

1748 births
1833 deaths
Clergy from Rome
19th-century Italian cardinals
L
Latin Patriarchs of Antioch
Cardinals created by Pope Gregory XVI